The 1976 Portuguese legislative election was held on Sunday 25 April, exactly one year after the previous election, and two years after the Carnation Revolution. With a new Constitution approved, the country's main aim was economic recovery and strengthening its democratic institutions. The election renewed all 263 members of the Assembly of the Republic.

The Socialist Party won a plurality of votes, almost 35%, and legislative seats, and its leader Mário Soares became the Prime Minister of the 1st Constitutional government on 23 July 1976. The lack of a socialist majority forced his party to form an unexpected coalition with the Democratic and Social Center, a right-wing party. The nature of this coalition, between a socialist party and a conservative party that voted against the new constitution because of its socialist influences, surprised most Portuguese voters and marked the start of the Socialist Party's right-wing turn that would soon be attacked by all the left due to the new government's measures against left-wing reforms following the Carnation Revolution, mainly concerning agrarian reform, in what was called the PS' putting "Socialism in the drawer".

The Social Democratic Party (then known as the Democratic People's Party, PPD) won the second most votes and seats, 24% of the votes, but polled 10 points below the PS. The Portuguese Communist Party (PCP) achieved considerable gains that reflected its growing influence, mainly in the south of the country, gaining 14% of the votes. The big surprise in the elections was the strong showing of the Democratic and Social Center (CDS), which polled ahead of PCP and gathered 16% of the votes. Only 19 years later, in 1995, would the CDS surpass the PCP in number of votes.

Voter turnout fell to 83.5%, compared with the 91.7% just a year before.

Background

Ongoing Revolutionary Process

The previous elections, held on April 25, 1975, elected a new assembly to write a new Constitution. The election results gave the two main moderate parties (PS and PPD) a clear majority in Parliament, with almost 38% for the PS and more than 26% for the PPD. The PCP achieved a weak result, just 12.5%, while the CDS polled ahead of the MDP. The election results started a conflict of legitimacy between parties, the Armed Forces Movement and the Revolutionary Council. It was the start of the Ongoing Revolutionary Process, which culminated in the Hot Summer of 1975.

On May 1, 1975, the PS and the PCP held separate rallies and some violent clashes occurred between PS and PCP supporters. A few days later, in what was called "The República case", far-left supporters invaded the headquarters of República newspaper. The reason was a strike by the typographers and other workers, many close to the far-left UDP, accusing the editorial board of being too aligned with the PS. The case drew widespread international attention, and the PS started a full blown attack against the PCP and Prime  Minister Vasco Gonçalves government.

Positions become extreme as Vasco Gonçalves led the Ongoing Revolutionary Process. He started facing big opposition from the so-called "reactionaries" (the Catholic Church, groups close to the former Estado Novo regime and, unofficially, from the PS, PPD and CDS.), therefore, Vasco Gonçalves continued and forced his Democratic socialism policies with the nationalization of huge parts of the Portuguese economy.

Hot Summer of 1975

By the beginning of the summer of 1975, the country was deeply divided. The "Hot summer of 1975" was starting. During this period, huge clashes between left and right supporters spread all across the country, some with big violence. The possibility of the country entering in a full blown Civil war was feared by many. On 19 July 1975, the PS held a massive rally in Lisbon, with the help of the Catholic Church and others, to fight against the PCP and Vasco Gonçalves government. Mário Soares, PS leader, accused the Gonçalves government, and those who support it, of being "Paranoids", "Demented" and "Irresponsibles who do not represent the Portuguese people".

During the summer of 1975, headquarters of the PCP, and other left-wing parties, in many cities in the North and Center of the country were vandalized and destroyed. Many leftwing supporters were also violently beaten by anti-left protesters. The violence and increased tensions across the country were damaging Vasco Gonçalves leadership in the government and divisions between the Armed Forces Movement and the Revolutionary Council were starting to show. When COPCON commander, Otelo Saraiva de Carvalho, withdrew his support from Gonçalves, the government was on its last days. On 20 September, Gonçalves leaves the government and Pinheiro de Azevedo is nominated as Prime Minister. Shortly after, on 26 September, the assault of the Spanish embassy in Lisbon by far-left supporters, in retaliation to the attacks on left-wing parties headquarters in the North and Center, drew widespread attention as it was broadcast by US network CBS.

25 November Coup and normalization

The new government was unable to control the tensions in the country and by mid November the government made the extraordinary announcement that they were on strike because there were no conditions to govern the country. Just before this announcement, construction workers unions surrounded Parliament and blocked MPs from leaving the building for two days.

All of this culminated in the events of the Coup of 25 November 1975. The coup was an attempted by left-wing activists who hoped to hijack the Portuguese transition to democracy in favor of Communists. The coup failed and shortly after a counter-coup led by Ramalho Eanes, a pro-democracy moderate, and supported by PS leader Mário Soares, re-established the democratic process.

By March 1976, the Constitutional Assembly finally drafted the Constitution text and was sent to approval in April 1976. The Constitution draft was heavily ideological, with many references to Socialism and with many phrases that echoed Karl Marx's Communist Manifesto. On 2 April 1976, the new Constitution was approved with the votes of all parties with the exception of CDS, which voted against citing the ideological content of the document. However, the party agreed to abide by it in the interim.

Electoral system 
The Assembly of the Republic has 263 members elected to four-year terms. The total number of MPs increased to 263 from the 1975 total of 250 MPs. Governments do not require absolute majority support of the Assembly to hold office, as even if the number of opposers of government is larger than that of the supporters, the number of opposers still needs to be equal or greater than 132 (absolute majority) for both the Government's Programme to be rejected or for a motion of no confidence to be approved.

The number of seats assigned to each district depends on the district magnitude. The use of the d'Hondt method makes for a higher effective threshold than certain other allocation methods such as the Hare quota or Sainte-Laguë method, which are more generous to small parties.

For these elections, and compared with the 1975 elections, the MPs distributed by districts were the following:

Parties 
The table below lists the parties represented in the Assembly of the Republic during the Constitutional Assembly (1975–1976) and that also, some, contested the elections:

Campaign period

Party slogans

Candidates' debates
The day after the elections, a round table was held on RTP1, moderated by Carlos Veiga Pereira, on the electoral results, with the participation of Mário Soares (Socialist Party), Francisco Sá Carneiro, (Social Democratic Party), Diogo Freitas do Amaral (Social Democratic Center), and Filipe Faria (UDP). Álvaro Cunhal (Portuguese Communist Party) declined to participate in the roundtable.

Results

Distribution by constituency

|- class="unsortable"
!rowspan=2|Constituency!!%!!S!!%!!S!!%!!S!!%!!S!!%!!S
!rowspan=2|TotalS
|- class="unsortable" style="text-align:center;"
!colspan=2 | PS
!colspan=2 | PPD
!colspan=2 | CDS
!colspan=2 | PCP
!colspan=2 | UDP
|-
| style="text-align:left;" | Angra do Heroísmo 
| 30.4
| 1
| style="background:; color:white;"|51.8
| 1
| 12.1
| -
| 1.5
| -
|colspan="2" bgcolor="#AAAAAA"|
| 2
|-
| style="text-align:left;" | Aveiro
| 30.8
| 5
| style="background:; color:white;"|35.2
| 6
| 22.5
| 4
| 3.7
| -
| 0.9
| -
| 15
|-
| style="text-align:left;" | Beja
| 32.0
| 2
| 8.2
| -
| 4.2
| -
| style="background:red; color:white;"|44.0
| 4
| 2.2
| -
| 6
|-
| style="text-align:left;" | Braga
| style="background:; color:white;"|32.3
| 6
| 28.6
| 5
| 21.2
| 4
| 4.2
| -
| 1.0
| -
| 15
|-
| style="text-align:left;" | Bragança
| 22.6
| 1
| style="background:; color:white;"|33.3
| 2
| 28.3
| 2
| 2.7
| -
| 0.8
| -
| 5
|-
| style="text-align:left;" | Castelo Branco
| style="background:; color:white;"|36.4
| 3
| 22.6
| 2
| 19.9
| 2
| 6.7
| -
| 1.1
| -
| 7
|-
| style="text-align:left;" | Coimbra
| style="background:; color:white;"|40.9
| 6
| 26.7
| 4
| 12.5
| 1
| 7.3
| 1
| 1.2
| -
| 12
|-
| style="text-align:left;" | Évora
| 30.3
| 2
| 9.2
| -
| 8.0
| -
| style="background:red; color:white;"|43.2
| 4
| 2.6
| -
| 6
|-
| style="text-align:left;" | Faro
| style="background:; color:white;"|44.6
| 6
| 19.3
| 2
| 6.8
| -
| 14.5
| 1
| 2.6
| -
| 9
|-
| style="text-align:left;" | Funchal 
| 24.9
| 1
| style="background:; color:white;"|53.0
| 4
| 13.3
| 1
| 1.5
| -
| 1.3
| -
| 6
|-
| style="text-align:left;" | Guarda
| 25.2
| 2
| 25.7
| 2
| style="background:; color:white;"|32.1
| 2
| 2.9
| -
| 1.1
| -
| 6
|-
| style="text-align:left;" | Horta
| 34.2
| -
| style="background:; color:white;"|57.0
| 1
| 4.3
| -
| 1.5
| -
|colspan="2" bgcolor="#AAAAAA"|
| 1
|-
| style="text-align:left;" | Leiria
| 31.1
| 4
| style="background:; color:white;"|31.2
| 4
| 19.4
| 2
| 7.3
| 1
| 1.0
| -
| 11
|-
| style="text-align:left;" | Lisbon
| style="background:; color:white;"|38.3
| 25
| 16.4
| 10
| 13.2
| 8
| 21.8
| 14
| 2.6
| 1
| 58
|-
| style="text-align:left;" | Ponta Delgada 
| 35.4
| 1
| style="background:; color:white;"|45.6
| 2
| 11.8
| -
| 1.5
| -
|colspan="2" bgcolor="#AAAAAA"|
| 3
|-
| style="text-align:left;" | Portalegre
| style="background:; color:white;"|41.9
| 3
| 10.1
| -
| 13.9
| -
| 22.0
| 1
| 1.0
| -
| 4
|-
| style="text-align:left;" | Porto
| style="background:; color:white;"|40.7
| 18
| 27.0
| 11
| 15.7
| 6
| 8.4
| 3
| 1.5
| -
| 38
|-
| style="text-align:left;" | Santarém
| style="background:; color:white;"|38.5
| 6
| 19.5
| 3
| 13.9
| 2
| 16.1
| 2
| 1.7
| -
| 13
|-
| style="text-align:left;" | Setúbal
| 32.2
| 7
| 8.4
| 1
| 4.4
| -
| style="background:red; color:white;"|44.4
| 9
| 2.8
| -
| 17
|-
| style="text-align:left;" | Viana do Castelo
| 25.5
| 2
| style="background:; color:white;"|32.8
| 3
| 23.5
| 2
| 6.6
| -
| 0.9
| -
| 7
|-
| style="text-align:left;" | Vila Real
| 26.3
| 2
| style="background:; color:white;"|39.0
| 4
| 18.3
| 1
| 3.1
| -
| 0.9
| -
| 7
|-
| style="text-align:left;" | Viseu
| 23.0
| 3
| style="background:; color:white;"|32.2
| 4
| 31.2
| 4
| 2.3
| -
| 0.9
| -
| 11
|-
| style="text-align:left;" | Europe
| style="background:; color:white;"|46.1
| 1
| 32.2
| 1
| 6.9
| -
| 10.1
| -
| 0.8
| -
| 2
|-
| style="text-align:left;" | Rest of the World
| 6.3
| -
| style="background:; color:white;"|53.2
| 1
| 33.7
| 1
| 1.4
| -
| 0.4
| -
| 2
|-
|- class="unsortable" style="background:#E9E9E9"
| style="text-align:left;" | Total
| style="background:; color:white;"|34.9
| 107
| 24.4
| 73
| 16.0
| 42
| 14.4
| 40
| 1.7
| 1
| 263
|-
| colspan=12 style="text-align:left;" | Source: Comissão Nacional de Eleições 
|}

Maps

Aftermath

Fall of the government
By the fall of 1977, the situation of the Portuguese economy was deteorating. During that year's summer, Prime Minister Mário Soares asked for a loan from the International Monetary Fund (IMF) and several austerity measures were implemented like rise of interest rates, devalue of the Escudo and budget cuts. However, the policies were quite unpopular and by late 1977, Soares was seeing big opposition in Parliament and, in November 1977, he proposed a big memorandum between parties and associations to seek common economic and social policies, but this was rejected. Because of this rejection, Soares presented a motion of confidence in Parliament, which he lost by a 100 to 159 vote margin.

Following this vote, Soares was still able to form a second cabinet, in coalition with the Democratic Social Center (CDS), but it only lasted 8 months and after August 1978, a series of Presidential appointed cabinets were nominated which culminated in the 2 December 1979 snap election.

Notes

References

External links
 Comissão Nacional de Eleições 
 Centro de Estudos do Pensamento Político

See also
 Politics of Portugal
 List of political parties in Portugal
 Elections in Portugal

Legislative elections in Portugal
1976 elections in Portugal
April 1976 events in Europe